Breathe, is the fourth solo album by former Ultravox frontman Midge Ure. The album was released 25 March 1996 in Continental Europe, 20 May in the U.K. and 18 June in the U.S. It was produced by the American producer Richard Feldman.

Background

The recording of the album was already finished in early 1995, but the release was postponed by the record company. The recording took place in various studios in Los Angeles, San Francisco, Dublin and in Ure's own studio in Bath. Ure first recorded four of the tracks with producer Julian Mendelsohn, but they were later re-recorded.

In 1998 the single "Breathe" became a hit-single in several European countries, boosted by its use in a Swatch TV advert campaign, two years after its original release. The single charted at No.1 both at the Italian and the Austrian charts, No.10 in Spain and No.12 in Germany. "Guns And Arrows" and  "Fields Of Fire" were also released as singles.

The album offer a rich mixture of musical influences inspired by Ure's own Scottish background. With The Chieftains Paddy Moloney on Uilleann pipes and Hothouse Flowers  Liam Ó Maonlaí on Bodhrán, Didgeridoo and Gaelic vocals, tracks like "Fallen Angel", "Sinnerman" and "Live Forever" pulse with the organic vibrancy that Ure had long wanted to capture.

Ure called "Breathe": Ure traces the origins of "Breathe" to a U.S. Tour he did with other songwriters in 1992. Once the other songwriters convinced him to try playing "Vienna" on acoustic guitar, Ure realized he could make music without the wealth of electronics or other musicians backing him up."That turned my whole perception of what I was doing musically".

Ure said about the album in 2015'':

The song "Live Forever" was inspired by Anne Rice book "Interview with the Vampire".

Ure said in 2015:

Track listing

1,5,10 & 11: written by Ure / 2 & 6: Ure, Feldman / 3: Ure, Feldman, Bazilian / 4: Ure, Feldman, Klein / 7 & 9: Ure, Mitchell / 8: Ure, Feldman, Shipley

Personnel
Midge Ure - Vocals, acoustic guitar
Soundcape Guitar (on tracks 5 and 11) – Robert Fripp
Double Violin, Vocals (on track 8) – L.Shankar
Mandolin, Melodica – Eric Bazilian
Vocals (on track 5) – Sally Dworsky
Uilleann Bagpipes  – Paddy Moloney
Backing Vocals – Jackie Sheridan, Kate Stephenson, Monalisa Young, Matthew Hager, Maxaynne Lewis 
Gaelic Vocals, Backing Vocals – Eleanor McEvoy
Fiddle – Frank Gallagher
Hurdy Gurdy, Harmonium – Ethan James
Accordion – Frank McNamara, Pat Crowley
Bodhrán, Didgeridoo, Vocals [Celtic] – Liam O'Maonlai
Guitar – Dean Parks
Bass Guitar – Larry Klein, Jeremy Meehan
Drums – David Palmer,  Andy Kravitz 
Cello – Ofra Harnoy
Celtic Harp  – Noreen O'Donoghue
Percussion - Mike Fisher, Iki Levy
Programming, Keyboards, Percussion – Richard Feldman
Keyboards - Charles Judge, Jamie Muhulrick

References 

Liner Notes

External links 
AllMusic

1996 albums
Midge Ure albums